Eugnosta percnoptila is a species of moth of the family Tortricidae. It is found in the Democratic Republic of Congo, Kenya and Tanzania.

The wingspan is 14–18 mm. The forewings are brownish grey with a golden sheen and with numerous tufts of raised scales. The hindwings are greyish brown with transverse striae.

References

Moths described in 1933
Eugnosta